Gaurium or Gaurion, also known as Gaureleon, was a town of ancient Greece on the island of Andros that acted as the harbour for the poleis of Andros.

Its site is located near modern Gavrio.

References

Populated places in the ancient Aegean islands
Former populated places in Greece
Ancient Andros